Emma Ruggiero (born April 12, 1997) is an American ice hockey forward, currently playing with the Buffalo Beauts of the National Women's Hockey League (NWHL).

Career 
During high school, she played with the Buffalo Regals.

From 2015 to 2019, she attended Buffalo State College, scoring 52 points across 100 NCAA Division III games. She served as team captain in her senior year.

In August 2019, she signed her first professional contract with the NWHL's Buffalo Beauts after trying-out in the Beauts' Free Agent Camp. After missing the first seven games of the season as a healthy scratch, she made her professional debut on November 23, 2019 against the Minnesota Whitecaps. She picked up one assist in ten games in her rookie NWHL season and was a recipient of the 2020 NWHL Foundation Award.

Style of play 
Noted for her speed and her tenacious forechecking, she has been described by Nate Oliver (prior to his becoming Beauts general manager) as "a spitfire on skates who barrels into corners with a devil-may-care style."

Personal life 
During the 2019–20 season, she also served as a coach in the Western New York Girls' Varsity Ice Hockey Federation. Her sister, Abby Ruggiero, currently plays hockey for the Cornell Big Red.

Career statistics

References

External links

1997 births
Living people
Buffalo Beauts players
People from Amherst, New York
American women's ice hockey forwards
Buffalo State College alumni
21st-century American women
Buffalo State Bengals athletes